The Mexico men's national water polo team represents Mexico in international men's water polo competitions and friendly matches.

Results

Olympic Games

 1952 — 18th place
 1968 — 11th place
 1972 — 13th place
 1976 — 10th place

World Championship

 1973 — 9th place
 1975 — 9th place
 1978 — 15th place

FINA World Cup
 No participation

FINA World League
 2007 — Preliminary round

Pan American Games

 1951 — unknown
 1955 — unknown
 1959 — unknown
 1963 — 5th place
 1967 — 3rd place
 1971 — 3rd place
 1975 — 1st place
 1979 — unknown
 1983 — unknown
 1987 — unknown
 1991 — unknown
 1995 — unknown
 1999 — 8th place
 2003 — 5th place
 2007 — 7th place
 2011 — 6th place

Central American and Caribbean Games

 1946 — 3rd place
 1950 — 1st place
 1954 — 1st place
 1959 — 1st place
 1962 — 1st place
 1966 — 2nd place
 1970 — 2nd place
 1974 — 2nd place
 1978 — 2nd place
 1982 — 2nd place
 1986 — 2nd place
 1990 — 2nd place
 1993 — 2nd place
 1998 — 3rd place
 2002 — 1st place
 2006 — 3rd place
 2010 — 3rd place
 2014 — 1st place
 2018 — 4th place

Squads

 2006 Central American and Caribbean Games —  Bronze Medal
Maximiliano Aguilar, Oliver Alvarez, Diego Castañeda, Armando García, Omar Gutierrez (c), Cutberto Hernandez, Hermes Ponce, Rainer Schmidt, Richard Schmidt, Jorge Lopez Chavez, Romel Palacios, Carlos Villegas, and Fausto Vazquez. Head Coach: Raúl de la Peña.
 2007 Pan American Games — 7th place
Omar Gutierrez (c), Jorge Perez Romero, Cutberto Hernandez, Rainer Schmidt, Erik Palácios, Jorge Lopez Chavez, Oliver Alvarez, Richard Schmidt, Diego Castañeda, Armando García, Fausto Vazquez, Julian Gonzalez, and Orlando Ortega. Head Coach: Raúl de la Peña.
 2008 Olympic Qualifying Tournament — 11th place
Orlando Ortega, Diego Castañeda, Rainer Schmidt, Jorge Lopez Chavez, Daniel Vazquez, Maximiliano Aguilar, Oliver Alvarez, Fausto Vazquez, Armando García, Richard Schmidt, Gonzalo Mejia, Jorge Perez Romero, and Andres Oñeto. Head Coach: Raúl de la Peña.
 1962 Central American and Caribbean Games —  Gold Medal
Oscar Familiar, Luis Guzman, Alfonso Barra Y Rivera "Fraile", Manuel Quejeiro, Head Coach: Ramón G. Velazquez.

See also
 Mexico women's national water polo team

References

 Sports123
 VilaCom

Water polo
Men's national water polo teams
National water polo teams in North America
National water polo teams by country
Men's sport in Mexico